Andrew John Whitfield Foster (born 21 December 1961) is a New Zealand politician who served as Mayor of Wellington from 2019 to 2022. Foster served on the Wellington City Council for nine terms from 1992 until 2019.

Biography

Early life
Foster was born on 21 December 1961 in Pembury, Kent, England, and moved with his family to New Zealand aged 5, originally settling in the Wellington suburbs of Ngaio and Khandallah before becoming a long-term Karori resident. He became a naturalised New Zealand citizen in 1978. Foster later studied at Victoria University of Wellington, gaining a Bachelor of Arts in history and economic history and a Bachelor of Commerce in business management.

Political career

Local body politics
In the late 1980s Foster became politically active and joined the National Party and worked as a parliamentary researcher for National for three years. When party colleagues were looking for people to stand in local government, Foster accepted nomination and stood for election in the 1992 local elections for the Wellington City Council on a Citizens' ticket. He was successful winning a seat from the Western Ward. Citizens did not operate as a ticket post-election. He held a seat in the Western Ward until 2004 when local electoral boundaries were re-drawn and he stood for the newly created Onslow-Western Ward and held a seat from there until 2019.

Foster stood for Mayor of Wellington on four occasions; first in 2001, coming fourth, then in 2016 placing fifth. Foster announced his third campaign for the mayoralty at the 2019 local elections and gained endorsement from Sir Peter Jackson. In a surprise, he narrowly beat the one-term incumbent, Justin Lester, by 62 votes after special and last-minute votes had been counted. Lester became the first Wellington mayor in 33 years to be replaced after just one term.

Foster is the president of TRAFINZ, which represents local authority views in New Zealand regarding road safety and traffic management. As a city councillor he was appointed to the boards of council-owned companies Capital Power (1991-1992), Wellington International Airport from 1996 to 1998, and Wellington Water's predecessor Capacity Infrastructure (2004-2014).

Mayor of Wellington, 2019–2022
Significant policies undertaken in his tenure  included the funding of the climate change "Te Atakura – First to Zero" action plan and the announcement of preferred options for the Let's get Wellington Moving transport infrastructure package. This included a second Mount Victoria Tunnel and a mass transit route from the Wellington railway station via the Basin Reserve to Newtown and Island Bay.

In April 2021, local mana whenua iwi Ngati Toa Rangatira and Taranaki Whanui were invited to have a representative with voting rights at council committee meetings. On 30 April 2022, a new strategic partnership was signed with local Iwi at Pipitea Marae.

In July 2021, Foster received acclaim from colleagues typically referenced as his political adversaries for his decision to light up the exterior of the council-owned Michael Fowler Centre with the colours of the transgender flag following confirmation a group considered by some to be transgender-exclusionary would speak there. In addition, Foster attended a counter-rally with Labour Party councilors Fleur Fitzsimons and Teri O'Neill, draped in the transgender flag.

In October 2021, Foster expressed disagreement with the Sixth Labour Government's Three Waters reform programme, which proposes transferring the management of water utilities from local councils to four new entities.

In October 2022, Foster became the second person in 36 years to hold the Wellington mayoralty for just one term. Voters selected Tory Whanau to replace him, with her gaining over twice as many votes after seven rounds of preferences.

Other political activities
Foster has  been involved with the Karori Wildlife Sanctuary Trust, Karori Sports Club, and the Karori Brooklyn Community Trust.

Foster is a self described "Bluegreen", a conservative environmentalist. In the lead up to the  general election Foster contemplated standing for Parliament as a candidate for New Zealand First. On 15 August 2017 he was confirmed as the New Zealand First candidate for the  electorate. He was placed 18 on the party's list.

References

External links

 Personal website

1961 births
Living people
People from Pembury
English emigrants to New Zealand
Naturalised citizens of New Zealand
Victoria University of Wellington alumni
Wellington City Councillors
Mayors of Wellington
New Zealand National Party politicians
New Zealand First politicians
Unsuccessful candidates in the 2017 New Zealand general election
People from Wellington City
Unsuccessful candidates in the 1996 New Zealand general election